The Baliem whistler or Balim whistler (Pachycephala balim) is a species of bird of the whistler family Pachycephalidae that is endemic to New Guinea.

Taxonomy and systematics
The Baliem whistler was formerly considered as a subspecies of the Australian golden whistler and also of the mangrove golden and the yellow-throated whistler. It has since been re-classified as a separate species by the IOC in 2016. Many other authorities do not yet recognize this split and re-classification.

Distribution
The Baliem whistler is found in the Snow Mountains of Papua Province in Indonesia.

References

Baliem whistler
Birds of Western New Guinea
Baliem whistler